Brett Robinson (born 8 May 1991 in Canberra) is an Australian track and field athlete specializing in the 5000 metres who has competed in the World Championships. Robinson qualified for the Tokyo 2020 Olympics. He came 66th in the Men's marathon with a time of 2:24.04.

Robinson trains with 2020 Tokyo Olympic runner, Stewart McSweyn.

Early years 
Robinson grew up in Canberra and played soccer until he was 10 years old. In Year 6 at school his PE teacher who was a runner himself noticed that Robinson was pretty good at cross country and started taking him to races. Robinson went to nationals as an U13 and was placed 18th. In high school he got himself a coach. From then onwards, Robinson was always in the top ten.

Robinson was very good at soccer and had to then make the decision, athletics or soccer. When 17 years old he went to the World Cross Country and ran the junior event. Two years later he made the 1500m final at the World Junior Championships.

Records and rankings
Robinson is a one-time silver medalist in the 3000 metres steeplechase and a one-time bronze medalist in the 10,000 metres in the Australian National Track & Field Championships. He is also a one-time silver medalist in the 1500 metres in the Australian National Junior Track & Field Championships. Robinson's current Australian all-time rankings are listed below.

Source:

Competitions

Junior World Championships
Robinson competed at the 2010 World Junior Championships in Athletics in Moncton, Canada. He was selected and competed in the 1500 metres. Robinson competed in heat three and finished 3rd in a time of 3:43.67. This performance qualified him for the final. In the final Robinson finished 8th out of a field of twelve in a time of 3:44.06.

Senior World Championships
Robinson was selected  to compete in the 2013 World Championships in Moscow in the 5000 metres. Robinson was in the first heat  and finished 7th in a time of 13:25.38. This qualified him for the final where he finished 15th in a time of 14:03.77.

World Cross-Country Championships
Robinson has competed in two World Cross Country Championships. His first appearance was in 2009 in the junior race (8 km). He finished 46th out of 121 competitors. He made his second appearance in 2013. This time he competed in the senior race (12 km) and finished 29th out of 102 athletes.

Statistics

Personal bests 

Sources:

Seasonal bests by Year

Achievements

References

External links
 

Living people
1991 births
Australian male middle-distance runners
Australian male long-distance runners
Australian male steeplechase runners
Olympic athletes of Australia
Sportspeople from Canberra
World Athletics Championships athletes for Australia
Athletes (track and field) at the 2016 Summer Olympics
Athletes (track and field) at the 2020 Summer Olympics
Australian male marathon runners
21st-century Australian people